, also known in the West as Planet Busters or The World of the Talisman, is a 1984 anime original video animation (OVA), which was released on VHS and DVD in North America by, variously, Streamline and ADV Films. The Japanese DVD was released by video game publisher Atlus on March 25, 2005.

It is based on the manga Birth Planet Busters by Yoshinori Kanada published in 1983.

It is based on a far futuristic planet where four mercenaries band together to try and unlock the power of the ultimate weapon which can either save humanity or destroy it. Against mechas and strange races, they sweep the vast planet to reach their goal.

Summary 
Aqualoid was a prosperous planet, but an attack from a mysterious life force, the Inorganics, transforms it into a post-apocalyptic shell of its former self. When Nam finds a mysterious sword, he is suddenly the object of a planet-wide chase. With the Inorganics closing in, will Nam and his friends discover the secret of the sword and save their world? Or will they destroy Aqualoid in favor of a new Birth?

Production
Yoshinori Kanada acted as one of the OVA's key animators. Another noteworthy animator on Birth was a young Hideaki Anno, who would go on to direct Neon Genesis Evangelion.

English dubs
Two English dubs of Birth exist. The first was licensed in 1987 by Harmony Gold and released by Streamline Pictures in North America and the United Kingdom under the title The World of the Talisman. According to New Straits Times, it briefly aired in Malaysia in late 1987. The OVA was later retitled yet again to Planet Busters. Harmony Gold's version changes some of the character names, tones down some of the more surreal Japanese humour to appeal to a younger audience, and contains more American-style dialogue, alternate music composed by Randy Miller and additional voice-overs. The second dub by ADV Films, released on DVD on July 13, 2004, is much more faithful to the original Japanese version.

Characters
In order of appearance - ADV (2004) / Streamline (1992, 1987) / Japanese (1984)
 Monga - Matt Hislope / __ / Fuyumi Shiraishi
 Mu-nyo - Cyndi Williams / __ / Chika Sakamoto
 Rasa - Alexis Chamov / Sandra Snow / Miina Tominaga
 Kim/Keen - Bradley Carlin / Ryan O'Flannigan / Kaneto Shiozawa
 Bao/Mo/Pao - James Phillips / Greg Snow / Ichiro Nagai
 Nam's Ostrich - Cyndi Williams / __ /
 Nam/Talon - Brent Werzner / Tony Oliver / Kazuki Yao
 Arlia - Gemma Wilcox / __ / Keiko Toda
 Orange Mole - Robert S. Fisher / __ /
 Inorganic Biker #1 - Robert Matney / A. Gregory / Ryunosuke Ohbayashi
 Inorganic Biker #2 - Matt Hislope / __ / Yusaka Yara
 Inorganic Biker #3 - Robert S. Fisher / __ / Kozo Shioya
 Village Girl/Child - Samantha Inoue-Harte / Rebecca Forstadt / Noriko Tsukase
 Grandma/Mother - Mary Agen Cox / Lisa Michaels / Reiko Suzuki
 Grandpa/Father - Garry Peters / __ / Joji Yanami
 Inorganic Biker Kid/Kooni - Jeffrey Mills / __ / Masahiro Anzai
 Monster Octopus - Robert S. Fisher / __ / Miki Takahashi
 Giant Inorganic - Vinnie Moxpar / __ / Yoko Kogayu
 Monga's Tribe - Bigjyl, Jim Damm, Robert S. Fisher, Samantha Inoue-Harte, Wil Ragan, Jessica Simon, Ben Turrabiarte, Racel Vasquez, Dominic Vitucci, Kenny Weigel

References

External links
 
 

1984 anime OVAs
ADV Films
Anime with original screenplays
Films set on fictional planets
Science fiction anime and manga
Single OVAs